Michael Lahti (born 1945) is a politician from the State of Michigan. A Democrat, Lahti served in the Michigan House of Representatives representing the 110th District, which is located in the Upper Peninsula and includes all of Iron County, Gogebic County, Ontonagon County, Baraga County, Houghton County, Keweenaw County and Powell Township in Marquette County.

Biography
Lahti was born in Hancock, Michigan on October 10, 1945 and graduated from Hancock High School. He graduated from Northern Michigan University in 1967. A year after he graduated, Lahti opened a State Farm Insurance agency in Hancock. Lahti was a small business owner and real-estate developer, owning private and commercial lands all across the Keweenaw Peninsula.  Lahti lives in Hancock with his wife, Sharon Lahti.  He has six children and eight grandchildren.

Political career
Lahti was elected to the Hancock area School Board in 1994, where he served for seven years.  Also in 1994, he was appointed to the Finlandia University board of trustees, where he served for 13 years.  In 2000, Lahti was elected to the Houghton County Commission as a Democrat.  He served as chairman of the Commission for 6 years.  In 2006 he announced his intention to run for the State House seat District 110, being vacated by Democrat Rich Brown.  The 110th District is located in the western portion of the Upper Peninsula and is one of the largest in the state.  Lahti easily won the Democratic Primary, and went on to face Republican Dave Schmidt in the General Election.  He won 64% to 34%.  He was easily re-elected in 2008 with 70% of the vote.

In 2010 Lahti ran for the Michigan Senate in the 38th district, which includes the western Upper Peninsula. Lahti lost to former state representative Tom Casperson.

Later career

Since leaving the House in 2011, Lahti has returned to the real estate profession. He has also been re-appointed to the Board of Trustees of Finlandia University.

Electoral history
2010 election for State Senate
Tom Casperson (R), 56%
Mike Lahti (D), 44%
2008 election for State House
Mike Lahti (D), 70%
John Larson (R), 30%
2006 election for State House
Mike Lahti (D), 64%
Dave Schmidt (R), 34%

External links
Rep. Lahti's official House Democrats website
Rep. Lahti's Michigan Senate campaign website

1945 births
Living people
People from Hancock, Michigan
American people of Finnish descent
Democratic Party members of the Michigan House of Representatives
Northern Michigan University alumni
21st-century American politicians